Eremoleon is a genus of antlions belonging to the family Myrmeleontidae. The species of this genus are found from the southern United States to Central America.

Species
This genus includes the following 37 species:

Eremoleon adonis Miller & Stange, 2016
Eremoleon anomalus (Rambur, 1842)
Eremoleon attenuatus Miller & Stange, 2016
Eremoleon capitatus (Navás, 1913)
Eremoleon cerverai (Navás, 1921)
Eremoleon cerverinus (Navás, 1921)
Eremoleon dodsoni Miller & Stange, 2016
Eremoleon dunklei Stange, 1999
Eremoleon durangoensis Miller & Stange, 2016
Eremoleon femoralis (Banks, 1942)
Eremoleon genini (Navás, 1924)
Eremoleon gracilis Adams, 1957
Eremoleon impluviatus (Gerstaecker, 1894)
Eremoleon inca Miller & Stange, 2016
Eremoleon insipidus Adams, 1957
Eremoleon jacumba Miller & Stange, 2016
Eremoleon jamaica Miller & Stange, 2016
Eremoleon longior Banks, 1938
Eremoleon macer (Hagen, 1861)
Eremoleon monagas Miller & Stange, 2016
Eremoleon morazani Miller & Stange, 2016
Eremoleon nigribasis Banks, 1920
Eremoleon ornatipennis (Alayo, 1968)
Eremoleon pallens Banks, 1941
Eremoleon petersensi (Banks, 1922)
Eremoleon petrophila Miller & Stange, 2011
Eremoleon phasma Miller & Stange, 2011
Eremoleon pulcher (Esben-Petersen, 1933)
Eremoleon punctipennis (Banks, 1910)
Eremoleon pygmaeus Miller & Stange, 2016
Eremoleon samne Miller & Stange, 2016
Eremoleon tanya Miller & Stange, 2016
Eremoleon tepuyiensis Miller & Stange, 2016
Eremoleon triguttatus (Navás, 1914)
Eremoleon venezolanus Miller & Stange, 2016
Eremoleon vitreus (Navás, 1914)

References

Myrmeleontinae
Myrmeleontidae genera